Sanford Dennis Biggar was mayor of Hamilton, Ontario from 1905 to 1906.

External links
 

Mayors of Hamilton, Ontario